Pedro Nezio de Araújo Lopes Ribeiro (born 13 June 1990) is a Brazilian footballer who currently plays for Västerås SK in the Swedish Superettan.

Playing career

Youth and College
Growing up in Belo Horizonte, Brazil, Ribeiro played college soccer at Coastal Carolina beginning in 2010. During his time with Coastal Carolina, Ribeiro won multiple Big South Regular Season titles (3) and Big South Tournament Titles (2) contributing 31 goals and 26 assists.

Club

Philadelphia Union
Ribeiro was selected as the 15th overall pick of the 2014 MLS SuperDraft by Philadelphia Union, who were familiar with him from a brief stint with their affiliate team, Reading United. Ribeiro made his professional debut and start on August 15 against Houston Dynamo. His first goal for the Union was scored in his third appearance in a home match against New York Red Bulls.

Ahead of the 2015 season, Riberio was selected by expansion side Orlando City SC in the 2014 MLS Expansion Draft.

Loan to Harrisburg
During the 2014 season, Ribeiro was loaned to Philadelphia USL affiliate Harrisburg City Islanders where he would make 12 appearances and scoring 4 goals.

Orlando City
Ribeiro's debut with Orlando came on 13 March 2015, away to the Houston Dynamo; he replaced Carlos Rivas in the 54th minute and twenty minutes later put pressure on Tyler Deric, leading the goalkeeper to score an own goal to give Orlando a 1–0 win. Pedro also scored in the 29th minute at Montreal and 89th minute at home against the Columbus Crew SC, both resulting in 2–2 draws.

Ribeiro was released by Orlando in November 2016 after not exercising his contract option.

Harrisburg City Islanders
Ribeiro signed with United Soccer League side Harrisburg City Islanders on 14 April 2017.

Fresno FC
Following a season with USL side Fresno FC, Ribeiro joined Swedish Superettan side IK Frej on 18 January 2019.

IK Frej
After one season with IK Freg, Ribeiro moved to Västerås SK on 29 November 2019, ahead of their 2020 season.

Personal
Ribiero earned his U.S. green card in summer 2015. This status also qualifies him as a domestic player for MLS roster purposes.

References

External links
 
 Coastal Carolina profile
 

1990 births
Living people
Footballers from Belo Horizonte
Brazilian footballers
Brazilian expatriate footballers
Coastal Carolina Chanticleers men's soccer players
Reading United A.C. players
Philadelphia Union players
Penn FC players
Orlando City SC players
Orlando City B players
Fresno FC players
IK Frej players
Västerås SK Fotboll players
Association football midfielders
Expatriate soccer players in the United States
Philadelphia Union draft picks
USL League Two players
USL Championship players
Major League Soccer players
Superettan players
Brazilian expatriate sportspeople in the United States
Brazilian expatriate sportspeople in Sweden